is a former Japanese football player.

Playing career
Tsukuda was born in Shizuoka Prefecture on June 28, 1977. He joined J1 League club Júbilo Iwata from youth team in 1996. On August 30, 1997, he debuted against Yokohama Flügels. He retired at the end of the 1998 season.

Club statistics

References

External links

1977 births
Living people
Association football people from Shizuoka Prefecture
Japanese footballers
J1 League players
Júbilo Iwata players
Association football defenders